F. montana may refer to:

Ficus montana, the Oakleaf Fig
Flabellobasis montana, a snout moth